The Carneau is a breed of pigeon developed over many years of selective breeding primarily as a utility pigeon. Carneau, along with other varieties of domesticated pigeons, are all descendants from the rock pigeon (Columba livia).
The breed is known for large size and suitability for squab production. White Carneau pigeons are extensively used in experiments on operant conditioning; most of the pigeons used in B. F. Skinner's original work on schedules of reinforcement were White Carneaux.

Origin
The Carneau originated in northern France and southern Belgium. Once a free flying breed, living by fielding.

See also 

List of pigeon breeds

References

Pigeon breeds
Pigeon breeds originating in France
Pigeon breeds originating in Belgium